Juary Jorge dos Santos Filho (born 16 June 1959), known simply as Juary, is a Brazilian retired footballer who played as a striker, and a manager.

Club career
Born in São João de Meriti, Rio de Janeiro, Juary started his career at Santos FC, being important as an 18-year-old to the club's 1978 conquest of the Paulistan League. He had his first spell abroad with Mexico's Leones Negros de Guadalajara, in the following year.

In 1980, Juary embarked on an Italian adventure that would last five seasons, as he mainly represented modest teams (U.S. Avellino, Ascoli Calcio 1898 and U.S. Cremonese – additionally, in 1982–83, he played with Inter Milan, scoring twice in Serie A).

Juary moved to Portugal and FC Porto, in the 1985 summer, serving as backup to club great Fernando Gomes. There, he achieved the greatest moment in his career when, on 27 May 1987, he came from the bench to net the decisive 2–1 against FC Bayern Munich in the 1986–87 European Cup final, assisted by Rabah Madjer who had just equalized the score.

However, Juary left Porto in the ensuing season, returning to his country with Associação Portuguesa de Desportos and moving back to Santos the following year, where he was not able to reproduce his previous form, finally retiring in 1990 with Moto Club, in São Luís, Maranhão.

In August 2007 Juary returned to Italy, being hired by S.S.C. Napoli as youth coach. In the following year, he filled the same position at former club Porto.

Juary was appointed as head coach of Eccellenza Basilicata amateurs Banzi in February 2009, but left only after two games (both ended in a loss), citing personal reasons that required his presence in Brazil.

In January 2010 Juary signed, also as main coach, at Lega Pro Seconda Divisione side S.F. Aversa Normanna, replacing Raffaele Sergio.

International career
Juary played twice for Brazil in 1979 (aged 20), going scoreless in the process: his debut came on 26 July against Bolivia, and he also appeared in a friendly with Argentina on 2 August. He was a member of the squad that took part at the Copa América that year, reaching the semi-finals.

Honours

Porto
Primeira Divisão: 1985–86, 1987–88
Taça de Portugal: 1987–88
European Cup: 1986–87
European Super Cup: 1987
Intercontinental Cup: 1987

References

External links

 

1959 births
Living people
People from São João de Meriti
Brazilian footballers
Association football forwards
Campeonato Brasileiro Série A players
Santos FC players
Associação Portuguesa de Desportos players
Liga MX players
Leones Negros UdeG footballers
Serie A players
U.S. Avellino 1912 players
Inter Milan players
Ascoli Calcio 1898 F.C. players
U.S. Cremonese players
Primeira Liga players
FC Porto players
Boavista F.C. players
Brazil international footballers
1979 Copa América players
Brazilian expatriate footballers
Expatriate footballers in Mexico
Expatriate footballers in Italy
Expatriate footballers in Portugal
Brazilian expatriate sportspeople in Italy
Brazilian expatriate sportspeople in Portugal
Brazilian football managers
Brazilian emigrants to Italy
Sportspeople from Rio de Janeiro (state)